Oskar Johannes Wirkhaus (13 November 1870 – 11 November 1920 Tartu) was an Estonian politician.

In 1920 he was Minister of Commerce and Industry.

References

1870 births
1920 deaths
Government ministers of Estonia